Ross R. Newdick (1936/1937 – November 2005) was a professional golfer from New Zealand. He had a successful amateur career winning the New Zealand Amateur Championship in 1960. He turned professional in 1963 and won the New Zealand PGA Championship and the Singapore Open in 1966.

Amateur career 
Newdick won the New Zealand Amateur in 1960, beating Ian Woodbury, 8 and 7, in the final at Invercargill. He represented New Zealand each year from 1959 to 1963, in the Commonwealth Tournament in 1959 and 1963, in the Eisenhower Trophy in 1960 and 1962 and in the Sloan Morpeth Trophy in 1961. In the Eisenhower Trophy, New Zealand finished 5th in 1960 and 4th in 1962.

Professional career 
Newdick turned professional in late 1963. He won both the New Zealand PGA Championship and the Singapore Open in early 1966. In January, he won the New Zealand PGA Championship after a final round of 64 to win by a stroke. In March, he won the Singapore Open, beating Lu Liang-Huan and George Will at the second hole of a sudden-death playoff. Newdick had been runner-up in the 1965 Hong Kong Open and in the 1965 Metalcraft Tournament, behind Peter Thomson on both occasions. He played in Europe in 1964, 1965 and 1966, playing in the Open Championship in 1964 and 1965. In the 1965 Open Championship at Royal Birkdale, he made the cut after rounds of 75 and 72. He was runner-up in the German Open in 1966.

Later life
After retiring from tournament golf, Newdick was involved golf course design and development. In 2005, while working in China, he was diagnosed with cancer and died two months later.

Amateur wins
1960 New Zealand Amateur

Professional wins (2)

New Zealand circuit wins (1)
1966 New Zealand PGA Championship

Far East Circuit wins (1)
1966 Singapore Open

Results in major championships

Note: Newdick only played in The Open Championship.
CUT = missed the half-way cut

Team appearances
Amateur
Commonwealth Tournament (representing New Zealand): 1959, 1963
Eisenhower Trophy (representing New Zealand): 1960, 1962
Sloan Morpeth Trophy (representing New Zealand): 1961 (winners)

References 

New Zealand male golfers
Golfers from Queensland
Sportspeople from the Sunshine Coast
1930s births
2005 deaths